Valentyn Arsentiyovych Zghursky was a head of the executive committee of the Kyiv City Council.

Biography
During World War II as a teenager he worked on Soviet railways. After graduating the Kyiv Polytechnic Institute in 1954 as an electrical engineer, in 1950s-1970s Zghursky worked at the Soviet Defense company "Radiopribor" (Radio Instrument) in Kyiv making there a career and eventually becoming its general director (1973-1979). Radiopribor was also known as the Korolyov Production Union.

After dissolution of the Soviet Union, Radiopribor was transformed into a Meridian Factory in 1994.

Honours and awards
 Hero of Socialist Labour (1981)
 Order of Lenin (1981, 1986)
 Order of the Red Banner of Labour (1966, 1971)
 Order of the October Revolution (1976)
 Order of the Patriotic War (1985, 1st class)
 Order of Bohdan Khmelnytsky (2000, 3rd class)
 Order of Prince Yaroslav the Wise (2007, 5th class)
 Order of Merit (1997, 3rd class)
 Order for Courage (1999, 3rd class)
 State Prize of Ukraine in Science and Technology

See also
 Ihor Surkis

References

External links
 Kalnytsky, M. Participant of remarkable events. "Evening Kyiv". 30 October 2014

1927 births
2014 deaths
People from Odesa Oblast
Communist Party of the Soviet Union members
Kyiv Polytechnic Institute alumni
Mayors of Kyiv
Tenth convocation members of the Soviet of Nationalities
Eleventh convocation members of the Soviet of Nationalities
Heroes of Socialist Labour
Laureates of the State Prize of Ukraine in Science and Technology
Recipients of the Order For Courage, 3rd class
Recipients of the Order of Bohdan Khmelnytsky, 3rd class
Recipients of the Order of Lenin
Recipients of the Order of Merit (Ukraine), 3rd class
Recipients of the Order of Prince Yaroslav the Wise, 5th class
Recipients of the Order of the Red Banner of Labour
Soviet colonels
Ukrainian colonels
Burials at Baikove Cemetery